The Italy national rugby union team (Italian: Squadra nazionale italiana di rugby) represents Italy in men's international rugby union. The team is known as gli Azzurri (the light-blues). Savoy blue is the common colour of the national teams representing Italy, as it is the traditional colour of the royal House of Savoy which reigned over the Kingdom of Italy from 1860 to 1946.

Italy has played international rugby since 1929, and for decades was considered one of the best European teams outside the Five Nations Championship. Since 2000, Italy has competed annually in the Six Nations Championship with England, France, Ireland, Scotland and Wales. In 2013, they were holders of the Giuseppe Garibaldi Trophy which is played annually between Italy and France. Italy is ranked 12th in the world by the IRB as of 13th February 2023.

Italian rugby rose to prominence in 2000 when it was added to the Five Nations, creating the Six Nations. Initially on the receiving end of some heavy defeats, the side grew in competitiveness, recording a fourth-place finish in 2007 and 2013, and one-sided defeats became less frequent. The Azzurri showed respectable results when playing at home in the early 2010s: they defeated France 22–21 in the 2011 Six Nations; and during the 2013 Six Nations, they again beat France 23–18, also defeating Ireland 22–15. Until 19 March 2022, Italy had not won a Six Nations game since beating Scotland in 2015. However, on 19 March, Edoardo Padovani scored a last minute try against Wales, to earn Italy their first win in 36 games, as well as their first away win against Wales and third away win in the tournament.

Italy has competed at every Rugby World Cup since the first tournament in 1987, where Italy played the inaugural game against New Zealand, but is yet to progress beyond the first round. The team has developed a reputation for being a consistent middle player at the tournament. Italy's results since the inception of a new group stage formula in 2003 have consistently followed a pattern of two wins against Tier 2 teams and two losses against Tier 1 ones (although in 2019, the match against New Zealand was cancelled due to Hagibis typhoon). The current head coach is Kieran Crowley, and the captain is currently Michele Lamaro.

History

Early history: 1911–34 
The first match played by an Italian XV was in 1911 between US Milanese and Voiron of France. On 25 July of the same year the "Propaganda Committee" was formed which in 1928 became the Federazione Italiana Rugby (FIR) (Italian Rugby Federation).

In May 1929, Italy played their first international losing 0–9 against Spain in Barcelona. In 1934, Italy was one of the founder members of FIRA, today's Rugby Europe; the others were France, Spain, Belgium, Portugal, Catalonia, Romania, Holland and Germany.

1945–85 
World War II meant a hiatus for Italian rugby union, as it did in other rugby-playing nations. Post-war, there was a desire to return to normal and Italian rugby union entered a new dimension thanks to the help of Allied troops in Italy.

In the 1970s and 1980s rugby union made enormous progress thanks to great foreign players (John Kirwan, Naas Botha, David Campese, Michael Lynagh) and coaches (Julien Saby, Roy Bish, Greenwood, Nelie Smith) in the Italian championship. Even foreign coaches were and continue to be chosen for the national team, like Bertrande Fourcade and Georges Coste. In 1973, the national team went on a tour of South Africa, coached by ex-Springbok prop Amos Du Plooey. Tours of England and Scotland followed, as well as games against Australia and New Zealand, the masters of their day. In 1978, Italy first played Argentina at Rovigo, winning 19–6.

1986–99 

Since the mid-1980s, Italy had been pursuing the ambition of playing in an expanded Five Nations Championship. Consistently winning against nations that now play in the European Nations Cup (Romania, Spain, Georgia, etc.), and good results against the major nations such as France, Scotland, Wales and Ireland meant that they were often talked as strong candidates.

In 1986, Italy hosted an England XV squad in Rome, drawing 15–15. The Azzurri took part in the first-ever Rugby World Cup match against New Zealand on 22 May 1987. The match proved a one-sided affair with New Zealand convincing 70–6 winners against a young Italy side. John Kirwan, later to become the Italy national coach, scored one of the tournament's greatest-ever tries for the All Blacks. Italy beat Fiji but lost to Argentina and finished third in their pool, failing to make the finals. In 1988, they played Ireland for the first time.

At the 1991 World Cup, Italy were grouped in a tough pool with the likes of England and the All Blacks. They lost both of these games but beat the USA. Italy first played Wales in 1994. At the 1995 World Cup in South Africa, Italy came close to beating England; losing 20–27, but recovered to beat Argentina. They finished third in their pool again below England and Western Samoa, but above the Argentines.

The late 1990s saw the Italians build a formidable side and record Test victories over Five Nations opposition. In 1996, a deal between British Sky Broadcasting and the Rugby Football Union meant that England home games were exclusively shown on Sky. England were threatened with being expelled from the Five Nations to be replaced by Italy. This threat was never carried out as a deal was worked out.

In 1996, Italy toured England, Wales and for the first time Scotland, losing all matches. The team recorded two consecutive victories over Ireland in 1997; 37–29 on 4 January, at Lansdowne Road, and 37–22 on 20 December, in Bologna. On 22 March 1997 they recorded their first win over France, 40–32, (in Grenoble). In January 1998, Scotland were the victims with Italy winning 25–21 (in Treviso); in the same year in the Rugby World Cup Qualifiers, they narrowly lost 15–23 against England at Huddersfield, but they argued for a try by Alessandro Troncon disallowed by the referee.

At the 1999 World Cup, Italy were drawn with New Zealand for the third time and lost again. They did not win a single pool match and went home before the knock-out stage.

Six Nations era: 2000–present 

Italy finally joined the Six Nations Championship in 2000 but their admission coincided with the departure of some of their best players. Nevertheless, they won their opening game against the reigning champions Scotland 34–20. Thereafter they struggled to compete against the other nations and their participation was called into question. The 2001 and 2002 tournaments were particularly disappointing as they did not win a single game. Coach Brad Johnstone was sacked in 2002 after an alleged show of 'player power'.

John Kirwan was then appointed coach. They managed to win their second Six Nations game in 2003, a 30–22 victory over Wales, thus avoiding the wooden spoon. They followed up by winning two games at the World Cup, another first. The tournament was, however, ultimately disappointing as the Welsh gained revenge with a 27–15 success. This, coupled with defeat against New Zealand, that meant that Italy were the only Six Nations country not to advance to the knock-out stage. Their third Six Nations win came against Scotland in 2004.

Italy, along with other nations, had made good use of IRB rules which allowed them to select foreign-born players if they had Italian ancestry or had lived in Italy for a qualifying period of three years. From 2004 they announced that they would only pick three such 'non-Italians' per team in order to develop their own domestic players.

In the 2005 Six Nations Italy finished bottom of the table again and failed to win a single game. Kirwan was sacked and replaced with Pierre Berbizier. Italy then went on a tour of Argentina where they surprised many by beating the Pumas 30–29 and drawing the series 1–1 (the only 2005 victory of a Northern Hemisphere team visiting a Southern Hemisphere team). However, the Pumas had their revenge when they visited Genoa and beat Italy 39–22.

In the 2006 Six Nations Championship Italy performed strongly against every team, leading against both England and France in the first half, but lost their first three games. They did, however, get a creditable 18–18 draw away to Wales, their first away point in the tournament, and were unlucky not to draw with Scotland in Rome in the final game, losing 10–13 courtesy of a late Scottish penalty.
In the 2007 Six Nations Championship, Italy started poorly, losing to France 3–39. However, Italy's performance improved, and they held England to a 20–7 result at Twickenham. Italy followed with a stunning start to their match at Murrayfield against Scotland, scoring three quick tries to give Italy a 21–0 lead after seven minutes, and the Azzurri went on to a 37–17 victory; their first-ever away win in the Six Nations. Italy's next match was against Wales in Rome, with Italy winning 23–20, for their first consecutive victories in the competition and help them achieve their highest-ever position in the competition. The domestic interest in rugby reached new heights with Italy's new success front page media coverage and the sport being held up as a model of fair play. Media and public interest in the national team was very high during the side's newfound success and on the final day a win could have seen them win their first ever six nations tournament, despite losing their last game to Ireland. 10,000 fans later greeted the national team at Rome's Piazza del Popolo.

The 2008 Six Nations Championship saw Italy again finish in last place, albeit by only a three-point margin. They took part in close matches against Ireland, Wales England and France respectively and managed a sole victory, defeating Scotland 23–20 in Rome in the last round of matches. In the summer tests they lost to South Africa but again managed to surprise 3rd ranked Argentina with a 13–12 victory. At the 2008 end of year tour Italy pushed the Wallabies in their clash in Padova, but the Australians eventually went on to win 30–20. A week later Italy were defeated by Argentina, 14–22.

Italy's 2009 Six Nations campaign was ill-fated almost from the beginning, with both scrum-halves ruled out of the competition before a ball was kicked, and a third alternative ruled out of the opener at England due to injury. Head coach Nick Mallett tried flanker Mauro Bergamasco at scrum-half. Mallett's gamble failed in epic fashion, with Bergamasco's mistakes leading to three England tries before he was replaced at half-time; England went on to win 36–11. In week two Italy also put in a poor performance against Ireland losing 9–38. The two poor performances were followed by another loss to Scotland. The Azzurri were competitive in their 15–20 loss at the Flaminio to a Wales side resting many of its key players for the championship decider against Ireland the next week. Italy finished in last place for the second straight year after losing to France on the final weekend of the tournament.

In the 2010 Six Nations Championship, Italy were well beaten by Ireland 11–29 before narrowly losing to England and defeating Scotland. Italy were defeated in their last two matches against France and Wales.

Italy finished the 2011 Six Nations with a 1–4 record.  In the opening match of the 2011 Six Nations, Italy was beaten by Ireland 11–13 at home, with Ireland scoring a drop goal less than two minutes before the final whistle. The Azzurri claimed a 22–21 home victory over the reigning Six Nations champions, France, gaining Italy's first win over France in a Six Nations game. At the final whistle, the English language commentator declared it the greatest win in Italian rugby history thus far.

Italy finished the 2012 Six Nations in fifth place with a 1–4 record, following a 13–6 win over Scotland before over 72,000 fans at the Stadio Olimpico in Rome. Italy's 15–19 loss to England was their smallest margin of defeat. The championship also saw Italy lose to Wales, Ireland and France.

Italy played three matches in the 2012 November internationals, losing two and winning one. Italy lost to New Zealand and Australia 19–22, with Italian fly half Luciano Orquera missing a penalty in the last minute which would have secured Italy's first draw against Australia. Italy did manage a win in the series, beating Tonga 28–23.

Italy gained their second Six Nations win over France when they beat them 23–18 on their opening match of the 2013 Six Nations Championship. Three defeats by Scotland, Wales and England followed. On their final game of the championship Italy won against Ireland 22–15 for the first time in a Six Nations match in front of 75,000 fans at the Stadio Olimpico. Overall Italy finished fourth, behind Scotland in third on points difference, to make it one of their most successful Six Nations. In November 2013, Italy hosted Australia at Turin for a 20–50 loss, then defeated Fiji 37–31 at Cremona and was defeated by Argentina 14–19 at Rome.

Italy were whitewashed at the 2014 Six Nations Championship, including a 20–21 home loss to Scotland, a 7–46 loss to Ireland and an 11–52 loss to England. In June the team made an Asia-Pacific tour, where they were defeated by Fiji, Japan and Samoa. In November they scored a home win to Samoa, a two-point loss to Argentina and another loss to South Africa.

In the 2015 Six Nations Championship, Italy took a 22–19 away win over Scotland to avoid the wooden spoon, but suffered heavy home losses to France and Wales. At the 2015 Rugby World Cup, they defeated Romania and Canada but lost to Ireland and France, repeating their performance of the previous three editions.

After another poor performance in 2016, losing all their Six Nations matches, Italy hired former Ireland international and Harlequin F.C. coach Conor O'Shea to coach the team; with him they also hired IRFU developmental director Stephen Aboud to direct youth programs aimed at strengthening the level of rugby in the country. In June, Italy lost to Argentina and won over the United States and Canada. On 19 November, Italy achieved a famous upset victory by defeating South Africa 20–18 which was Italy's first win against the Springboks in 13 attempts at Stadio Artemio Franchi in Florence. This victory also marked their first win over one of the three big Southern Hemisphere nations (Australia, New Zealand, South Africa).

They lost all their matches in the 2017, 2018, 2019, 2020 and 2021 Six Nations tournaments, a losing run of 32 games. 

Finally in their final match of the 2022 Six Nations Championship Italy had an historic win over Wales. They scored a try in the 80th minute with the conversion the final act in the match to win by 22–21 at the Principality Stadium on 19 March 2022.

Wins against Tier 1 nations 
Wins against Tier 1 nations have included:

Stadium and attendance 
Before joining the Six Nations in 2000 Italy did not have a set stadium and played their home matches in various stadiums around Italy. From 2000 to 2011 Italy played all of their home Six Nations matches at the Stadio Flaminio in Rome. The Italian Rugby Federation (FIR) announced, in January 2010, that the stadium would undergo an expansion, that will increase its capacity to 42,000. Continued delays to the start of construction meant that the revamp could not be completed in time for the 2012 Six Nations so all of Italy's home Six Nations games were moved to the Stadio Olimpico, also in Rome. The expansion of the Stadio Flaminio was originally promised to be complete by 2014. It was planned that upon completion of the renovation, the team would move back to the Stadio Flaminio, however little was achieved and as of September 2016 the stadium was still in a state of abandoned disrepair. More Italians are attending rugby union games and whereas before most of the fans at the Stadio Flaminio were away fans. Since moving to the Stadio Olimpico attendances have increased by huge numbers. Italy has drawn large crowds since 2008, particularly for Six Nations matches and for matches against New Zealand:

Strip 
Italy traditionally plays in blue jerseys, white shorts and blue stockings at home. Its away uniform consists of a uniform with the inverted colours. Both uniforms have on the chest the Scudetto, even if until the 1990s the non-test Italian teams had the coat of arms of the Maritime republics on the jersey.

Awards

Record

Overall 

Below is table of the representative rugby matches played by an Italy national XV at test level up until 20 November 2022.

Six Nations 
Italy entered the International Championship in 2000 when it became the Six Nations, and made a positive start by winning their debut match 34–20 against Scotland. They finished fifth in 2003 above Wales in the final standings, having defeated them 30–22, and were again fifth the following year above Scotland, after beating them 20–14. In 2006, Italy drew with Wales 18–18 at the Millennium Stadium in Cardiff.

Italy's first three Six Nations match victories, in 2000, 2003, and 2004, had been in front of a home crowd at the Stadio Flaminio in Rome. However, on 24 February 2007, they defeated Scotland 37–17 at Murrayfield for their first away win in the competition. Two weeks later, they defeated Wales for the second time, 23–20 back in Rome. This was the first time that Italy had won two of their five games in the championship, and they finished the 2007 Six Nations Championship in fourth place.

Italy won the Giuseppe Garibaldi Trophy for the first time in 2011 with a close-fought 22–21 victory over France. Two years later, they lifted the trophy for a second time by defeating France 23–18. Italy also recorded a first Six Nations victory over Ireland in 2013, beating them 22–15, and equalling their best finish of fourth place in the final standings. On 28 February 2015, Italy achieved their second away win against Scotland, a tight 22–19 victory, and after a 36-match losing streak they won in Wales for the first time on 19 March 2022 by 22–21.

, Italy have won thirteen Six Nations matches: seven of these against Scotland, three against Wales, two against France and one against Ireland. England is the only team that Italy have yet to beat in the championship.

Rugby World Cup 

Italy have competed at every Rugby World Cup since the competition's inception in 1987. Italy finished third in their pool at their first World Cup, defeating Fiji, but not making the finals. They did not make the finals in 1991, grouped in a tough pool with England and the All Blacks. At the 1995 Rugby World Cup in South Africa, they finished behind England and Western Samoa, but above Argentina in their pool.

In 1999 they did not make the finals, with their defeats by the All Blacks and Tonga. Italy won two pool games at the 2003 World Cup, defeating both Canada and Tonga, but lost to the All Blacks and Wales.
Italy played the 2007 Rugby World Cup in Pool C, against New Zealand, Scotland, Romania and Portugal (who had been beaten 83–0 by Italy in the qualifiers), with the goal of reaching the quarter finals for the first time. However, in the crucial group match against Scotland, Italy were undone by indiscipline. Chris Paterson kicked all of Scotland's points in an 18–16 victory, despite Italy crossing the line for the game's only try.

European championships 

Before 2000, Italy was one of the leading European teams outside the Five Nations, along with Romania, and for a while the USSR.

Italy competed in the original European Championships from 1936 to 1938, but World War II meant that the tournament would not resume until 1952. Italy then competed in these tournaments from 1952 to 2000. Italy achieved only one victory, the 1995–97 FIRA Trophy.

Thirties wins

The fifties: the European Cup, Italian positions

The Nations Cup 1966–73

The FIRA Trophy 1974–97

Players

Current squad
On 29th January Kieran Crowley announced a 33-man squad for the Italy's opening two matches of the 2023 Six Nations matches against France (5 Feb) and England (12 Feb).

On 20th February Kieran Crowley announced a 35-man squad for the match of the 2023 Six Nations against Ireland (25 Feb); Buonfiglio, Zambonin and Montemauri replace Polledri.

On the 8 th March Kieran Crowley announced a 33-man squad for Italy's final two matches of the 2023 Six Nations; Page Relo, Zanon and Gesi replace Buonfiglio, Montemauri, Lucchin and Capuozzo. 

Head coach:  Kieran Crowley
 Caps updated: 18 March 2023

Coaches

Current coaches
  Kieran Crowley (Head Coach)
  Marius Goosen (Defence)
  Corrado Pilat (Backs)
  Andrea Moretti (Forwards)
  Giovanni Sanguin (Skills)

Coaching history 

Updated 11 March 2023

Player records (career)

Most caps 

Last updated: Italy vs Wales, 11 March 2023. Statistics include officially capped matches only.

Most tries 

Last updated: Italy vs Wales, 11 March 2023. Statistics include officially capped matches only.

Most points 

Last updated: Scotland vs Italy, 18 March 2023. Statistics include officially capped matches only.

Most matches as captain 

Last updated: Scotland vs Italy, 18 March 2023. Statistics include officially capped matches only.

Player records (single match)

Most points in a match 

Last updated: Italy vs Wales, 11 March 2023. Statistics include officially capped matches only.

Most tries in a match 

Last updated: Italy vs Wales, 11 March 2023. Statistics include officially capped matches only.

See also 
 Italy A national rugby union team
 Italy national rugby league team
 Top12
 United Rugby Championship

References

External links 

Federazione Italiana Rugby official site

 
Rugby union in Italy
European national rugby union teams